"I Want to Be Loved Like That" is a song written by Phil Barnhart, Sam Hogin and Bill LaBounty, and recorded by American country music band Shenandoah.  It was released in September 1993 as the second single from the album Under the Kudzu.  The song spent 20 weeks on the Hot Country Songs charts, reaching a peak of number 3. It also went to number 2 on Gavin Report and number 1 on Radio & Records. The song also peaked at number 4 on the RPM Country Tracks charts dated January 24, 1994.

Content
In this ballad, the narrator gives examples of relationships like Natalie Wood and James Dean, and his mother and father, then states he wants to be loved with the same affection they had for each other.

Chart performance
"I Want to Be Loved Like That" debuted on the U.S. Billboard Hot Country Singles & Tracks for the week of October 9, 1993.

Year-end charts

References

1993 singles
1993 songs
Shenandoah (band) songs
Songs written by Bill LaBounty
Song recordings produced by Don Cook
RCA Records singles
Songs written by Sam Hogin
Songs written by Phil Barnhart (songwriter)